The Calder Valley line (also previously known as the Caldervale line) is a railway route in Northern England between the cities of Leeds and Manchester as well as the seaside resort of Blackpool. It is the slower of the two main rail routes between Leeds and Manchester (the other being the Huddersfield line), and the northernmost of the three main trans-Pennine routes.

Services

Passenger train services are operated by Northern and run on the following pattern:

 Bradford Interchange–Halifax– (Class 150 and occasionally Class 158 )
 Leeds––Manchester Victoria–Wigan Wallgate (Class 158 and occasionally Class 195 Civity)
 Leeds–Halifax–Manchester Victoria– (Class 195 Civity)
 York–Leeds–Halifax–Preston–Blackpool North (Class 195 Civity)
 –Burnley––Manchester Victoria (Class 150 or 156)
 –Bradford Interchange–Leeds–Hull (Class 158)

This line, along with the Huddersfield line and York and Selby lines, was in the past combined in national timetables to show a coast-to-coast service but since May 2018 has been split again into separate routes for operational reasons and to improve service reliability. Through running to Chester (with a limited peak provision to  via Helsby) began in May 2019.

Services within West Yorkshire are sponsored by West Yorkshire Metro, whose tickets (including Metrocards) can be used up to Hebden Bridge between Leeds and Blackpool, and Walsden between Leeds and Manchester.

Route

Before the 1923 Grouping the first section of the line (Leeds–Bradford) was owned by the Great Northern Railway (GNR); and the entire remainder by the Lancashire and Yorkshire Railway (L&YR), apart from the final section of the branch leading into Huddersfield, which was owned by the London and North Western Railway (LNWR).

For the section between Halifax and Burnley the line uses the valley of the River Calder, which in fact comprises two separate valleys with rivers of the same name, that of West Yorkshire and the Lancashire River Calder thus giving the services their name; it also follows the Rochdale Canal from Todmorden into Manchester.  Since the route crosses the Pennines, there are many tunnels to negotiate en route.

The British Railways Board's Corporate Plan for 1983–1988 marked the routes between Milner Royd Junction (east of Sowerby Bridge) and Bowling Junction (south of Bradford Interchange); and Milner Royd Junction and Heaton Lodge Junction (west of Mirfield) to be 'singled' on a list "The Proposed Elimination of Non-Essential Multiple Tracks".  A combination of factors meant this was never implemented: the better gradients for freight than the Huddersfield trans-Pennine route; and the mid-1980s uncertainty over the Settle-Carlisle route meant that this became the preferred route for goods between Leeds and Preston/Carlisle.

Today, Hebden Bridge and Leeds are the only stations where every service calls, the route description follows.

Leeds–Bradford
For the initial section of the route between Leeds and Bradford, see Leeds–Bradford lines.

Bradford–Halifax
Many stations on this route have been closed. Stations currently open are in bold. Original places served, and notes on the route:
 Bowling was named Bowling Junction for its link with the GNR at this point
 here is Bowling Tunnel 1648 yd (1483m)
 Low Moor, also a junction with GNR. Closed in 1965 and reopened in April 2017.
 here was a triangular junction for the L&YR line to Dewsbury
 here are two tunnels: New Furnace Tunnel and Wyke Tunnel
 Wyke and Norwood Green
 here is Pickle Bridge junction for the Pickle Bridge Line to Huddersfield: now closed, there were two stations, Bailiff Bridge and Clifton Road
 Lightcliffe
 here is Lightcliffe Tunnel
 Hipperholme
 here is Beacon Hill Tunnel 1105 yd (995m)
 Halifax

On 24 October 1901, as the 6.10 pm down goods train from Low Moor to Leeds to was passing through Bowling Tunnel, the rear section broke loose. It came to a stop in the tunnel and was run into from behind by the 9.05 pm goods train from Low Moor to Laisterdyke. Wreckage partly blocking the up line was then hit by the 9:00 pm passenger train from Leeds to Manchester. Nobody was killed but there was extensive damage to rolling stock.

Halifax–Huddersfield
This route was re-opened to passengers in 2000 when Brighouse station was re-opened, and two short lengths of line were relaid (after being out of use for 15 years) to enable trains to reach Huddersfield.
 At Dryclough Junction the Huddersfield route leaves the main line.
 Greetland station closed in 1962.
 Elland station closed in 1962 and is under consideration for reopening.
 Brighouse
 Bradley station closed in 1950,
 Deighton is only used by trains on the Huddersfield line; Calder Valley line trains do not call there.
 Huddersfield

Halifax–Manchester Oxford Road
Many stations on this route have been closed (or are not served by the Calder Valley line trains): original stations served:
 here was the triangular junction for the line via Mirfield to Dewsbury; Brighouse station is on this line.
 here is Bank House Tunnel
 here was Copley station
 the line now turns west into the Calder valley, joining the original 1840 main line at Milner Royd Junction.
 Sowerby Bridge
 at Sowerby Bridge heading west the line used to branch off to Ripponden. It was originally intended to continue to Littleborough but ended at Rishworth. Closed to passengers 8 July 1929.
 here was Luddendenfoot railway station now closed
 Mytholmroyd
 here is Mytholmroyd Railway Viaduct
 Hebden Bridge
 (all Calder Valley Line services serve Hebden Bridge)
 here is Weasel Hall Tunnel
 here was Eastwood station
 here are: Castle Hill Tunnel; Horsfall Tunnel; and Millwood Tunnel
  Hall Royd Junction: here the trains on the Blackpool service turn northwestward, following the Calder Valley (see below)
 Todmorden here the line takes a southward direction, in the same valley as the Rochdale Canal
 Walsden 
 after Winterbutlee Tunnel follows Summit Tunnel, at 2885 yd (2597 m) the longest on the L&YR lines. Here the line crosses into the Rochdale District of Greater Manchester
 Littleborough
 Smithy Bridge
 Rochdale: junction for two lines: to Bacup (closed to passengers 16 June 1947) and to Oldham
 Castleton: junction for a line to Bury
 Middleton Junction junction for two lines: Middleton branch; and Oldham (both closed)
 Mills Hill
 Moston
 Newton Heath
 Miles Platting
 Manchester Victoria
 The train passes Salford Central railway station on the formerly L&MR line before traversing the Ordsall Chord to join the formerly CLC line.
 Deansgate
 Manchester Oxford Road

On 28 February 1902 a Wakefield to Rose Grove goods train broke into two due to a broken coupling, resulting in the rear half eventually crashing at high speed into the front half in Millwood Tunnel. No one was killed but wreckage filled the tunnel right up to the roof.

Summit Tunnel was the scene of a major fire in 1984, caused when a freight train hauling petrol tankers derailed.

Blackpool route
Trains continue up the Calder valley to Burnley and Blackburn; it also runs parallel with the Leeds and Liverpool Canal from Burnley. The section from Todmorden to Burnley (often called the Copy Pit line)  was opened by the Manchester and Leeds Railway (later L&YR) on 12 November 1849.  The East Lancashire Railway (later L&YR) built the Burnley to Preston line, Burnley to Accrington 18 September 1848, Accrington to Blackburn 19 June 1848, and the Blackburn to Preston section on 1 June 1846.

The Rose Grove–Todmorden (Hall Royd) local service over this route ended in 1965, the only passenger services thereafter being a daily Leeds–Blackpool train.  In mid-1982 the last tanker train travelled over the line, with the expectation of closure shortly after.  A turning point came when the National and Provincial Building Society moved staff from Burnley to Bradford.  The Society arranged for a Preston–Bradford Interchange train to be run to move staff from their home base to Bradford offices.  In October 1984 British Rail developed this into five trains each way between Leeds and Preston with one extended to Blackpool.

Todmorden curve
The Todmorden curve is a  section of track at Hall Royd Junction in Todmorden which was lifted in 1972. Originally Hall Royd Junction was triangular, and the lifted curve allowed services from Burnley to reach Manchester via Todmorden (regular services over it had ceased in November 1965). Reinstating the curve was a priority for Lancashire County Council and was ranked as the most important project in its 2010 Rail Improvement Schemes draft report. The government stated in March 2010 that reinstating the link would cost around £7 million and any new rail services would require initial subsidy. Burnley MP Kitty Ussher wrote to the North West Development Agency to seek assurance that it could find the money. In October 2010 Network Rail agreed to pay for the final assessment of the plans. This assessment, completed in May 2011, concluded that it could be feasible to reinstate the curve, although the original route could not be used as the original curve was deemed to be too sharp. An alternative route was instead put forward, and it was stated that, if funds could be obtained by early 2012 to carry forward the project, the curve could be back in use by the end of 2013.

On 31 October 2011, the deputy Prime Minister announced that the scheme would be given the go-ahead.

Construction work began in summer 2013, and the curve was planned to be available for the May 2014 timetable change. The track was completed and tested in May 2014, and services began on 17 May 2015.

Original stations
Many stations on this route have been closed (or are not served by the Calder Valley line trains): original stations served and other notes on the route:
 Hall Royd Junction: see above; there are now no stations on the route before Burnley; stations once served, and notes on the route:
 here is the junction with the original line from Todmorden (to Burnley), forming a triangle (closed 1972, but reopened in 2015).
 Stansfield Hall station opened 1869, closed July 1944
 here is Kitsonwood Tunnel (290 yards)
 Nott Wood (Lydgate) viaduct
 Cornholme station closed to all traffic 26 September 1938
 Portsmouth closed 7 July 1958
 Copy Pit summit (749 ft)
 Holme Tunnel (265 yards)
 Holme: closed 28 July 1930
 Towneley Tunnel (398 yards)
 Towneley: serving the nearby Towneley Hall, closed 4 August 1952
 Burnley Manchester Road station: (there are also Burnley Barracks and Burnley Central see below)
 Gannow Junction where the line joins from Colne, Nelson, Brierfield, Burnley Central and Burnley Barracks
 Rose Grove has an island platform with 2 disused bay platforms.
 here was the Rose Grove Junction for the North Lancashire Loop, an alternative route to Blackburn via Padiham, Simonstone and Great Harwood (closed to passengers 2 December 1957)
 Hapton
 Huncoat
 Accrington
 here was the triangular junction for the line to Bury (closed 5 December 1966)
 Church and Oswaldtwistle
 Rishton
 Rishton Tunnel
 here was the other end of the line from Burnley at Great Harwood Junction
 Blackburn Tunnel

Blackburn to Preston
This line is described in more detail in East Lancashire line.
 Blackburn: junction of the line to Bolton
 Mill Hill
 Cherry Tree
 here was the L&YR/LNWR joint line (the Lancashire Union Joint Railway) to Chorley and the West Coast Route (opened 1 November 1869 and closed to passengers 4 January 1960)
 Pleasington
 Hoghton
 Bamber Bridge
 here was a junction for a direct route to Preston, the surviving route continues to Preston via Lostock Hall where there are further junctions, including one for the former through route to Liverpool.

Preston to Blackpool
This route is described in more detail in Blackpool branch lines.
 Preston: the joint LNWR/L&YR station on the West Coast Route
 Lea Road
 Salwick
 Kirkham and Wesham
 here were junctions: for the direct route to Blackpool; and the coast route via Lytham St Annes on Sea
 Singleton
 Poulton-le-Fylde
 here was the junction for Fleetwood (line closed to passengers 1 June 1970)
 Layton (opened as Bispham)
 Blackpool North was named Talbot Road

Holme Tunnel engineering work
Holme Tunnel, which lies between Hebden Bridge and Burnley Manchester Road, was closed for 20 weeks from November 2013 until March 2014. This was to allow for major engineering work to fix the distorted shape of the tunnel, caused by movement of the ground through which it passes. The project was budgeted to cost £16.3million. During the works, buses replaced train services. Trains can now pass through at 45 mph.

Future

Improvements to the line were proposed as part of Network Rail's 2010 Northern Hub plans, which would allow for more frequent services on the line. The Chester services started in December 2017 under the proposed "Northern Connect" brand, which has since been scrapped. Those services are  operated by new 100 mph Class 195 diesel trains by December 2019. In 2018, the Manchester Airport trains briefly ran over the Ordsall Curve. However, those services have also been scrapped. Track and signalling upgrades between Hebden Bridge and Leeds (following on from work already carried out between Littleborough and Manchester) will allow for quicker journey times by the autumn of 2018. The work will see four existing signal boxes between Hebden Bridge and Mill Lane Junction in Bradford closed and signalling control transferred to the Rail Operating Centre at York. The ROC will also take over the operation of the parts of the line through Brighouse and Mirfield currently controlled from Huddersfield and Healey Mills panel boxes.

 station, between Bradford Interchange and Halifax, reopened on 2 April 2017 after the original opening planned for 2005 was delayed by the discovery of disused mine workings under the station site. A business case is being developed to re-open  station between Halifax and Brighouse.

Calderdale Council have called for the route to be electrified as an alternative route to the line through Huddersfield should that be closed for engineering works. Tim Swift, the leader of Calderdale Council in 2015 stated "It makes no logical sense in terms of a long term network to electrify the Trans-Pennine Route and not the Calder Valley Line". In March 2015 The Northern Sparks report was produced by a committee of Members of Parliament from all parties focusing on economic benefits of electrification in the North. The Calder Valley line in its entirety was number one priority. This was reiterated in 2018.

The Integrated Rail Plan for the North and Midlands (IRP) is a government document that was published on 18 November 2021. This document says that the line from Leeds to Bradford Interchange will be electrified.

As part of the TFGM's Delivery Plan, there are plans to electrify the line between Manchester Victoria to Rochdale via Mills Hill. This is part of the 2040 Strategy, and they aim to complete business cases for the early delivery of it with potential delivery in 2026, subject to funding.

References

Further reading

External links

West Yorkshire Metro

Rail transport in West Yorkshire
Rail transport in Greater Manchester
Transport in Leeds
Railway lines in North West England
Railway lines in Yorkshire and the Humber